Xira is a 2019 Nepali action film directed and written by Ashutosh Raj Shrestha. It stars Namrata Shrestha, Anoop Bikram Shahi, Promod Agrahari, Srijana Regmi, Raymon Das Shrestha, Suzta Shrestha, Samrat Magar.

Cast 

 Namrata Shrestha as Xira
 Anoop Bikram Shahi as Xira's husband
 Promod Agrahari as Raja
 Srijana Regmi as Bullet
 Samrat Magar as Xira's coach 
 Raymon Das Shrestha
 Suzta Shrestha as Shilu

Reception 
Diwakar Pyakurel of OnlineKhabar wrote, "Xira might have numerous limitations in terms of the story as well as presentation. The movie, of course, could have been more enriched and powerful. Its cinematographic review might point at other dimensions of strengths and weaknesses. But, from the feminist point of view, Xira is one of the few Nepali films that celebrate the feminine power to defy patriarchal restrictions". Abhimanyu Dixit of The Kathmandu Post wrote, "You want to like Xira, you really do, but it just won't let you". Sunny Mahat of The Annapurna Express wrote, "What the movie actually promised as the first ever MMA-based film was a ‘feast of fury’ combined with a lot of action-packed sequences. But, alas, gross negligence in many aspects of filmmaking make "Xira" not even worth sitting through its short 1 hr 35 mins length".

References

External links 

 

Nepalese action films
Cultural depictions of Nepalese women